Stephen F. Butz (born February 28, 1959) is a Democratic member of the Missouri General Assembly representing the State's 81st House district.

Career
Butz was elected unopposed on 6 November 2018 from the platform of Democratic Party.

Electoral History

References

1959 births
21st-century American politicians
Living people
Butz, Steve